Ponthoile is a commune in the Somme department of Hauts-de-France in northern France.

Geography
Ponthoile is situated on the D235 road, some 15 km northwest of Abbeville, near the bay of the Somme.

History
In 1346, during the Hundred Years War, English troops burnt and pillaged the towns of the Ponthieu on their way to the Battle of Crécy. Ponthoile was attacked on Saint-Barthélémy's day, 24  August, just two days before the battle, burning down the 12th-century church.

In the 13th century, there were 180 homes in Ponthoile, according to Dom Grenier. After the ravages of the wars against the English and Burgundians, according to English statistics, there were only 48. The population of Ponthoile subsequently increase slowly into the middle of the 19th century, before declining again, as farming became mechanisied and people left for the big cities

Demography

Main sights 
 Memorial to the aviation pioneers, the brothers Caudron.
 Church of Saint Pierre. Badly damaged by two fires, it was decided, in 1836, to build a bigger, better church in brick and slate.

See also
Communes of the Somme department

References

External links

 Ponthoile municipal website 
  Charter of the commune of Ponthoile 

Communes of Somme (department)